The Zbrojovka Z 6 Hurvínek was a car produced by Československá Zbrojovka in the 1930s. Originally developed as a smaller vehicle for sale alongside the Z 4, 400 of the car were sold between 1935 and 1938. It had sufficient range to drive between Prague and Brno.

Design
Designed as a smaller complement to the Zbrojovka Z 4, the Z 6 Hurvínek was a two-door sedan of conventional front-engine, front-wheel-drive layout.

Performance

Production
The car was announced in October 1935 at the Prague Motor Show and sales continued after the factory moved to military production from 1936, the last car being sold in 1938. 480 examples were sold at a price of 19,800 Kčs.

References

Cars introduced in 1935
Cars of the Czech Republic
Front-wheel-drive vehicles